The Naval Special Warfare Development Group (NSWDG), abbreviated as DEVGRU ("Development Group") and commonly known as SEAL Team Six, is the United States Navy component of the Joint Special Operations Command (JSOC). The unit is often referred to within JSOC as Task Force Blue. DEVGRU is administratively supported by Naval Special Warfare Command and operationally commanded by JSOC. Most information concerning DEVGRU is designated as classified, and details of its activities are not usually commented on by either the United States Department of Defense or the White House. Despite the official name changes, "SEAL Team Six" remains the unit's widely recognized moniker.

DEVGRU and its Army and Air Force counterparts, Delta Force and 24th Special Tactics Squadron, are the U.S. military's primary Tier 1 special mission units tasked with performing the most complex, classified, and dangerous missions directed by, until 2002, the National Command Authority, and since then, directly from the President or the Secretary of Defense. DEVGRU conducts various specialized missions such as counterterrorism, hostage rescue, special reconnaissance, and direct action (short-duration strikes or small-scale offensive actions), often against high-value targets.

History

The origins of DEVGRU are in SEAL Team Six, a unit created in the aftermath of Operation Eagle Claw. During the Iran hostage crisis in 1979, Richard Marcinko was one of two U.S. Navy representatives for a Joint Chiefs of Staff task force known as the TAT (Terrorist Action Team). The purpose of the TAT was to develop a plan to free the American hostages held in Iran. In the wake of the disaster at the Desert One base in Iran, the Navy saw the need for a full-time counter-terrorist unit and tasked Marcinko with its design and development.

Marcinko was the first commanding officer of this new unit. At the time, there were two SEAL Teams, SEAL Team ONE and SEAL Team TWO. Marcinko named the unit SEAL Team Six in order to confuse Soviet intelligence as to the number of actual SEAL teams in existence. The unit's plankowners (founding members) were interviewed and hand-picked by Marcinko from throughout the UDT/SEAL community. SEAL Team Six was formally commissioned in November 1980, and an intense, progressive work-up training program made the unit mission-ready six months later. SEAL Team Six became the U.S. Navy's premier hostage rescue and counter-terrorism unit. It has been compared to the U.S. Army's elite Delta Force. Marcinko held the command of SEAL Team Six for three years, from 1980 to July 1983, instead of the typical two-year command in the Navy at the time. SEAL Team Six started with 75 shooters. The unit has virtually unlimited resources at its disposal. In 1984, Marcinko and a dozen members of SEAL Team Six would go on to form "Red Cell" (also known as OP-06D), a special unit designed to test the security of American military installations.

In 1987, SEAL Team Six was dissolved. A new unit named the "Naval Special Warfare Development Group" was formed, essentially as SEAL Team Six's successor. Reasons for the disbanding are varied, but the name SEAL Team Six is often used in reference to DEVGRU.

Controversies

In 2010, during the attempted rescue of British aid worker Linda Norgrove from Taliban kidnappers in Afghanistan, she died as a result of injuries sustained from a SEAL's errant hand grenade. In 2017, Army Special Forces Staff Sergeant Logan Melgar died from trauma received during an apparent on-base hazing incident in Mali that resulted in the criminal prosecutions of two DEVGRU members and two Marine Raiders.

Following a two year investigation  by The Intercept, a report was released in 2017, accusing SEAL Team Six and its commanding officers of abuses, crimes and coverups. The investigation included interviews with numerous members and officers of the unit,  who recounted the group's involvement in abuses, including what some members described as war crimes. Former unit members and officers said that commanding officers tolerated and covered up abuses.

Recruitment, selection and training

In the early stages of creating SEAL Team Six, Marcinko was given a six-month window to produce the team. Had he failed to do so, the project would have been canceled. Consequentially, Marcinko had little time to create a proper selection course on par with Delta Force's process. To get around this, recruits were selected after assessing their Navy records, followed by individual interviews. According to Marcinko's book Rogue Warrior, SEAL Team Six members were chosen if they had initial struggles qualifying in aspects of training, but subsequently qualified, as the determination of these candidates was seen as more valuable than a candidate that breezed through his training. Originally, applicants came only from the east coast and west coast SEAL teams and the Underwater Demolition Teams.

Although much of the training and recruitment is classified, there are some requirements and training exercises that are now public knowledge. The requirements to apply for DEVGRU states that applicants must be male, be 21 years old or older, have served at least 2 deployments on their previous assignments, and be eligible for Secret clearance. Candidates come from the East/West Coast SEAL teams, SEAL Delivery Vehicle (SDV) teams, the Special Boat teams (for Gray Squadron), the Navy explosive ordnance disposal (EOD) teams, and Navy SARCs. Enlisted candidates must be in the pay grades of E-4 through E-8 and Officer candidates need to be O-3 through O-4 to apply. Candidates must undergo physical screening, psychological testing and are then interviewed to deem whether they are suitable for assignment to NSWDG. Those who pass the stringent recruitment process will attend an eight-month selection and training course with the unit's training department known as "Green Team". The training course attrition rate is high, usually around 50%; during one selection course, out of the original 20 candidates, 12 completed the course. All candidates are watched closely by DEVGRU instructors and evaluated on whether they are suitable to join the individual squadrons. Howard E. Wasdin, a former member of SEAL Team Six said in a 2011 interview that 16 applied for SEAL Team Six selection course and two were accepted. Those who do not pass the selection phase are returned to their previous assignments and are able to try again in the future.

Like all special operations forces units that have an extremely intensive and high-risk training schedule, there can be serious injuries and deaths. SEAL Team Six/DEVGRU has lost several operators during training, including parachute accidents and close-quarters battle training accidents. It is presumed that the unit's assessment process for potential new recruits is different from what a SEAL operator experienced in his previous career, and much of the training tests the candidate's mental capacity rather than his physical condition. Every candidate chosen will have already completed their respective advanced training pipelines; Basic Underwater Demolitions/SEAL training, the Special Warfare Combatant-Craft Crewman training, Special Amphibious Reconnaissance Corpsman training, the Navy EOD training or Navy Dive School.

Candidates are put through a variety of advanced training courses led by civilian or military instructors. These can include free climbing, land warfare, advanced unarmed combat techniques, defensive and offensive advanced driving, advanced diving, communications and Survival, Evasion, Resistance and Escape training. Candidates are also taught how to pick locks on cars, doors, and safes. All candidates must perform at the top level during selection, and the unit instructors evaluate the candidate during the training process. Selected candidates are assigned to one of the Tactical Development and Evaluation Squadrons. Unlike regular SEAL Teams, SEAL Team Six operators can attend almost any other military course to receive further training depending on the unit's requirements.

Like Delta Force, live-fire marksmanship drills in both long-range and close-quarter battle drills are done with hostage roles being played by other students to help build the candidates' trust between each other.

DEVGRU regularly trains and operates with special forces units from other countries such as the British Special Air Service and Special Boat Service, Australia’s Special Air Service Regiment and 2nd Commando Regiment, Israel’s Shayetet 13 and Canada’s Joint Task Force 2.

Structure
DEVGRU is divided into color-coded line squadrons:
 Red Squadron (Assault)
 Blue Squadron (Assault)
 Gold Squadron (Assault)
 Silver Squadron (Assault)
 Black Squadron (Intelligence, Reconnaissance, & Surveillance)
 Gray Squadron (Mobility Teams, Transportation/Divers, QRF)
 Green Team (Selection/Training)

Each assault squadron, usually led by a Commander (O-5), is divided into three troops of enlisted SEALs, often called assaulters. Each of these troops is commanded by a senior commissioned officer, which is usually a Lieutenant Commander (O-4). A troop chief also serves as an adviser to the troop commander and is the highest-enlisted SEAL in the troop, usually a Master Chief Petty Officer (E-9). A DEVGRU troop is further divided into smaller teams of SEALs.  Each troop has around 16 members and is led by a senior commissioned officer, as well as a troop chief. These individual teams of assaulters are led by senior enlisted SEALs; usually a Senior Chief Petty Officer (E-8), sometimes a Chief Petty Officer (E-7). The rest of these teams are filled out with more Chief Petty Officers (E-7), Petty Officers First Class (E-6), and Petty Officers Second Class (E-5); each member with a respective role.

Each assault squadron also has a specific nickname. Examples include Gold Squadron's Crusaders, Red Squadron's Indians, Blue Squadron's Pirates, Silver Squadron's Headhunters, and Gray Squadron's Vikings. The assault squadrons are supported by a variety of support personnel, including cryptologists, communicators, EOD technicians, dog handlers, and sometimes airmen from the United States Air Force 24th Special Tactics Squadron, the Air Force's JSOC element.

According to the Government Accountability Office report on special operations forces, in the fiscal year of 2014, DEVGRU had a total of 1,787 authorized positions, of which 1,342 are military and 445 are civilian.

Firearms
The following is a list of firearms known to be used by DEVGRU, but because of the unit's secretive nature, this list is not exhaustive.

Carbines
Noveske 10.5" NSR 5.56×45mm
Heckler & Koch HK416 5.56×45mm (previously favored rifle among operators and usually modified, both significantly and varied to personal preference, with SOPMOD accessories such as suppressors, stocks, optics, lasers, lights and grips) 
Heckler & Koch MP7 4.6×30mm
Colt Mk 18 CQBR 5.56×45mm
M4A1 (various manufacturers) 5.56×45mm (not as commonly used, but still in inventory. Also customized with SOPMOD items)

Sniper and anti-materiel rifles
Colt Mk 12 SPR 5.56×45mm
Knight's Armament Company SR-25 7.62×51mm
Remington Model 700 "Mk 13 Mod. 5" .300 Winchester Magnum
McMillan Firearms TAC-338 .338 Lapua
McMillan TAC-50 "Mk 15 Mod. 0 .50 BMG
Barrett M107A1 .50 BMG

Sidearms
Heckler & Koch HK45 "Mk 24 Mod. 0" .45 ACP 
SIG Sauer P226 "P226R Mk 25" 9×19mm
Glock 19 9×19mm
SIG Sauer P320 9×19mm

Commanding Officers

The unit's first commanding officer was a Commander (O-5). Following his departure, the billet was changed to that of a Captain (O-6), and remains so currently.

Roles and responsibilities

DEVGRU's full mission is classified but is thought to include pre-emptive, pro-active counter-terrorist operations, counter-proliferation (efforts to prevent the spread of both conventional weapons and weapons of mass destruction), as well as the elimination or recovery of high-value targets from unfriendly nations. DEVGRU is one of a handful of U.S. Special Mission Units authorized in the use of pre-emptive actions against terrorists and their facilities.

When SEAL Team Six was first created in 1980, it was devoted exclusively to counter-terrorism with a worldwide maritime responsibility; its objectives typically included targets such as ships, oil rigs, naval bases, coastal embassies, and other civilian or military bases that were accessible from the sea or inland waterways. On certain operations, small teams from SEAL Team Six were tasked with covertly infiltrating international high-risk areas to carry out reconnaissance or security assessments of U.S. military facilities and embassies to give advice on improvements in order to prevent casualties in an event of a terrorist attack. SEAL Team Six was disbanded in 1987, and its role, minus non-counter-terrorism ship-boarding, which was given to the newly formed SEAL Team 8, given to the newly formed DEVGRU.

Since the start of war on terror, DEVGRU has evolved into a multi-functional special operations unit with a worldwide operational mandate. Such operations include the successful rescue of Jessica Buchanan and Poul Hagen Thisted, the attempted rescue of Linda Norgrove, the successful rescue of American doctor Dilip Joseph and in 1991, the successful recovery of Haitian President Jean-Bertrand Aristide and his family during a coup that deposed him.

The official mission of the currently operating Naval Special Warfare Development Group mission is "to provide centralized management for the test, evaluation, and development of equipment technology and Techniques, Tactics and Procedures for Naval Special Warfare". DEVGRU and the Army's Delta Force train and deploy together on counter-terrorist missions usually as part of a joint special operations task force (JSOTF). The Central Intelligence Agency's highly secretive Special Activities Center and more specifically its elite Special Operations Group often works with, and recruits from, DEVGRU. The combination of these units led ultimately to the killing of Al-Qaeda leader Osama bin Laden in Operation Neptune Spear.

See also

 Sister JSOC units;
 1st Special Forces Operational Detachment – Delta
 24th Special Tactics Squadron
 Intelligence Support Activity
Additional SEAL articles;
 List of Navy SEALs
 '''Other maritime-based special operations units 
 GRUMEC (Brazil)
 Frømandskorpset (Denmark)
 Commandos Marine (France) 
 Kampfschwimmer (Germany)
 MARCOS (India)
 Shayetet 13 (Israel)
 COMSUBIN (Italy)
 MARSOF (Netherlands)
 JW Formoza (Poland)
 Special Actions Detachment (Portugal)
 Naval Special Warfare Force (Spain)
 Special Boat Service (UK)

Notes

References

Further reading

 
 
 

 
United States Joint Special Operations Command